Makonnen is an Ethiopian given name. Notable people with the name include:

Makonnen Wolde Mikael (1852–1906), Ethiopian governor and father of Haile Selassie I
Makonnen Endelkachew (1890–1963), Ethiopian aristocrat and Prime Minister
Tafari Makonnen Woldemikael (1892–1975), birth name of Ethiopian Emperor Haile Selassie I
T. Ras Makonnen (1900–1983), Guyanese-born Pan-African activist
Prince Makonnen  (1923–1957), son of Haile Selassie I
Endelkachew Makonnen (1927–1974), Ethiopian aristocrat and politician
Seifu Makonnen (born 1953), Ethiopian Olympic boxer
Tamarat Makonnen (born 1972), American music video director
Makonnen Sheran (born 1989), American musician, known professionally as iLoveMakonnen 
Prince Joel Dawit Makonnen (born 1982), member of the Ethiopian Imperial Family
Ariana Austin Makonnen, American philanthropist and member of the Ethiopian Imperial Family
Abel Makonnen Tesfaye (born 1990), better known by his stage name The Weeknd, Canadian singer, songwriter, rapper, and record producer

See also
 Mekonnen

Ethiopian given names